Pembroke Township is one of seventeen townships in Kankakee County, Illinois, USA.  As of the 2010 census, its population was 2,140 and it contained 1,062 housing units.  Pembroke Township was formed from parts of Momence township on February 17, 1877. From its beginning through today, Pembroke Township was a site of community for Black farmers.

Geography

Cities, towns, villages
 Hopkins Park

Unincorporated towns
 Doney at 
 Leesville at 
 Saint Anne Woods at 
 Tallmadge at 
(This list is based on USGS data and may include former settlements.)

Adjacent townships
 Momence Township (north)
 Lake Township, Newton County, Indiana (northeast)
 McClellan Township, Newton County, Indiana (east)
 Beaverville Township, Iroquois County (south)
 St. Anne Township (west)
 Ganeer Township (northwest)

Cemeteries
The township contains the Guiding Star Memorial Cemetery.

Demographics

Economy
As of November 11, 2009, according to a CBS newspaper article, due to misappropriation of funds, the Federal Government cut funding to the tiny village of Hopkins Park which fired the entire police force.  Two of three elementary schools were closed. Currently, the County Sheriff provides very limited patrols. Almost half the working age adults are out of work. Pembroke was once home to a Nestle Corporation factory where more than 100 people worked.

Government
The township is governed by an elected Town Board of a Supervisor and four Trustees.  The Township also has an elected Assessor, Clerk, Highway Commissioner and Supervisor.  The Township Office is located at 4053 South Main Street, PO Box A, Hopkins Park, IL 60944.

Political districts
 Illinois's 11th congressional district
 State House District 79
 State Senate District 40

School districts
Pembroke Community Consolidated School District #259
 St. Anne Community Consolidated School District 256
 St. Anne Community High School District 302

Black Farming Community 
Pembroke is a historically Black farming community, at times one of the largest concentrations of Black farmers north of the Mason-Dixon line. The first Black residents of Pembroke arrived in the 1860s: the Tetter family led by patriarch Joseph ‘Pap’ Tetter came from North Carolina. They settled on 42 acres of land which was either bought or acquired using adverse possession laws and established Hopkins Park.  Many sources repeat the story that Hopkins Park/Pembroke was a stop along the Underground Railroad. The Tetters were the first of a long tradition of Black farmers in Pembroke; people who had been forced to farm as slaves and sharecroppers could now cultivate their own small plots of land. In the late 1800s and early 1900s, some parts of life in Pembroke were racially segregated, but many Black and white farmers worked together, likely more so than in surrounding parts of Kankakee County.

Unlike many surrounding areas with rich soil, the soil in Pembroke is sandy and lower quality. This can present challenges for growing food, but it also allowed many Black families to buy land in an area that became mostly ignored by white farmers. According to the Chicago Field Museum, "soil seen as poor by outsiders is an asset in Pembroke," requiring farmers to be creative and often collaborate. Some local farmers sold agricultural and livestock products for profit locally as well as to Chicago and other midwestern cities. Others were and continue to be homesteaders who grew food for themselves. Large groups of Black farmers came to Pembroke during the Great Migration (from the South) and an even larger group moved to the area during the Great Depression (from Chicago). Pembroke became almost entirely Black by the time WWII ended. According to the Black Oaks Center, a local Black-run farm, “Pembroke was the 3rd largest hemp producer in the nation” during WWII.

Although the area struggles with high poverty rates and a decreasing population size, the tradition of Black farmers continues in the area today with places like the Black Oaks Center and Iyabo Farms.

References
 
 United States Census Bureau 2007 TIGER/Line Shapefiles
 United States National Atlas

Further reading
Pembroke: A Rural, Black Community on the Illinois Dunes by Dave Baron, 2016, Southern Illinois University Press

External links
 Kankankee County Official Site
 City-Data.com
 Illinois State Archives

Townships in Kankakee County, Illinois
1877 establishments in Illinois
Townships in Illinois